Matagorda Independent School District is a public school district based in the community of Matagorda, Texas (USA).

The district has one school - that serves students in grades pre-kindergarten through 12.

In 2009, the school district was rated "academically acceptable" by the Texas Education Agency.

References

External links
 

School districts in Matagorda County, Texas
Public K–8 schools in Texas